During the 1906–07 English football season, Brentford competed in the Southern League First Division. The highlight of the mid-table season was a run to the third round of the FA Cup.

Season summary 

Following the death of Dick Molyneux, William Brown was appointed Brentford secretary-manager on a permanent basis at the end of the 1905–06 season, having initially been appointed interim manager in February 1906. He retained the Bees' nucleus of players (Watson, Jay, Parsonage, Tomlinson, Corbett, Underwood, Greaves, Shanks) and brought in a new goalkeeper (Williams), two full backs (McConnell and Taylor), half back Haworth and four new forwards (Greechan, Hagan, McAllister and Pentland).

Brentford were a model of inconsistently throughout the Southern League First Division season, only winning consecutive matches on two occasions. Key forward Tommy Shanks went on strike early in the season and was transferred to Leicester Fosse for £250, which weakened the forward line. Fred Pentland proved to be an able replacement and finished as second-leading goalscorer behind Fred Corbett. The highlight of the mid-table season was a run to the third round of the FA Cup for the second consecutive season, though the Bees were denied a first appearance in the fourth round after being taken to a replay by Southern League First Division strugglers Crystal Palace and then suffering defeat at Griffin Park. Brentford finished the season £150 in profit (equivalent to £ in ), the first time the club had done so since turning professional in late 1899.

Two club records were set during the season:
 Most Southern League home wins in a season: 14
 Most Southern League away draws in a season: 5

League table

Results
Brentford's goal tally listed first.

Legend

Southern League First Division

FA Cup 

 Source: 100 Years of Brentford

Playing squad

Left club during season

 Source: 100 Years of Brentford

Coaching staff

Statistics

Appearances

Goalscorers 

Players listed in italics left the club mid-season.
Source: 100 Years Of Brentford

Management

Summary

References 

Brentford F.C. seasons
Brentford